Cabaniss Field is the baseball stadium for the varsity baseball team of the Corpus Christi Independent School District.

The school district allowed the stadium to be used starting in 1976 for minor league baseball, but did not allow the team to sell beer, so the team left after the 1977 season.  When minor league baseball moved back to Corpus Christi in 2005, a new park – Whataburger Field – was built downtown for the new team.

External links
Cabaniss Field on Charlie's Ballparks

Sports venues in Corpus Christi, Texas
High school football venues in Texas
Baseball venues in Texas
Minor league baseball venues
1940s establishments in Texas